Word of God Christian Academy is a private, Christian, coeducational, primary and secondary day school located in Raleigh, North Carolina,  United States. Also known as Word of God, the school was founded in 1993.

In 2015, a North Carolina think tank found that Word of God received $180,600 in public funds through the state's voucher program for lower-income students, the most of any private school.

History
Along with Word of God Fellowship Church and the affiliated daycare center, the academy was founded by Bishop Frank Summerfield, who died in 2017.

In 2006, the NCAA refused to accept diplomas from Word of God as part of an effort to crack down on diploma mills.

Notable alumni 
Rawle Alkins — NBA basketball player for the Chicago Bulls
James L. Dickey III (born 1996) - basketball player for Hapoel Haifa of the Israeli Basketball Premier League
 C. J. Leslie — professional basketball player 
Isaiah Todd — current NBA G-League player
 John Wall — NBA basketball player for the Los Angeles Clippers
 T. J. Warren — NBA player
 Dez Wells — professional basketball player

References

External links
 Christian Academy School website
 Word of God Fellowship Christian Church
 Summerfield Ministries

Private schools in Raleigh, North Carolina
Private high schools in North Carolina
Private middle schools in North Carolina
Private elementary schools in North Carolina
Christian schools in North Carolina
1993 establishments in North Carolina
Educational institutions established in 1993